The 1956–1957 Detroit Red Wings were one of six teams in the 40th season of the National Hockey League. The team finished with a record of 38 wins, 20 losses, and 12 ties, giving the Red Wings the best record in the regular season and the Prince of Wales Trophy. Their record earned the Red Wings first seed in the 1957 Stanley Cup Semi-finals, where Detroit lost their playoff series with the Boston Bruins 4–1.

Gordie Howe led the NHL in both goals scored (44) and points overall (89), beating fellow Red Wing Ted Lindsay by four points. Howe also won the Art Ross Trophy and Hart Memorial Trophy.

Final standings

Record vs. opponents

Game log

Player statistics

Regular season
Scoring

Goaltending

Playoffs
Scoring

Goaltending

Note: GP = Games played; G = Goals; A = Assists; Pts = Points; +/- = Plus-minus PIM = Penalty minutes; PPG = Power-play goals; SHG = Short-handed goals; GWG = Game-winning goals;
      MIN = Minutes played; W = Wins; L = Losses; T = Ties; GA = Goals against; GAA = Goals-against average;  SO = Shutouts;

See also
1956–57 NHL season

References

 

Detroit
Detroit
Detroit Red Wings seasons
Detroit Red Wings
Detroit Red Wings